Bradley Dredge (born 6 July 1973) is a Welsh professional golfer who plays on the European Tour. He has won twice on the tour, the 2003 Madeira Island Open and the 2006 Omega European Masters, both by 8 strokes. He also won the 2005 WGC-World Cup in partnership with Stephen Dodd.

Biography
Dredge was born in Tredegar. He turned professional in 1996.

Dredge attempted to gain his card on the European Tour via the qualifying school in 1995 and 1996, the second time doing sufficiently well to gain a place on the Challenge Tour for 1997. He finished 15th in the rankings, having won the Klassis Turkish Open during the season, and graduated directly to the European Tour for 1998. He failed to win enough money during his rookie season to retain his status, and returned to the Challenge Tour the following season. He was again successful with a win at the Is Molas Challenge and a second-place finish at the Challenge Tour Championship helping him to 8th on the money list, and graduation back to the European Tour.

Dredge finished 105th in the 2000 European Tour Order of Merit, and then established himself on the tour, finishing inside the top 100 on the Order of Merit every season from 2001 to 2011. His first win on the European Tour came at the 2003 Madeira Island Open, and in 2006 he claimed his second title at the Omega European Masters. He achieved a career best Order of Merit position of 16th in 2005, and in the post-season he won the WGC-World Cup for Wales in partnership with Stephen Dodd. Dredge featured in the top 50 of the Official World Golf Rankings for short periods in 2006 and 2007. He was exactly 50th in the rankings at the end of 2006, giving him a place in the 2007 Masters Tournament.

After a poor 2012 Dredge lost his full European Tour playing rights and failed to regain his card at qualifying school. However, he retained conditional status for 2013. Illness and injury forced him to miss most of the 2013 season, but he was granted a medical extension for 2014, during which season he played in nine tournaments on the European Tour. He recorded back-to-back second-place finishes, and regained his card for 2015 by finishing 81st in the Race to Dubai.

2016 was his best season since 2007, finishing 31st in the Order of Merit. He was runner-up in the Dubai Duty Free Irish Open and the Made in Denmark tournament.

Amateur wins
1991 Welsh Boys Championship
1993 Welsh Amateur Championship

Professional wins (7)

European Tour wins (2)

1Dual-ranking event with the Challenge Tour

European Tour playoff record (0–1)

Challenge Tour wins (3)

1Dual-ranking event with the European Tour

PGA EuroPro Tour wins (1)

European Pro Golf Tour wins (1)

Other wins (1)

*Note: The 2005 WGC-World Cup was shortened to 54 holes due to rain.

Results in major championships

CUT = missed the half-way cut
"T" = tied

Results in World Golf Championships
Results not in chronological order before 2015.

QF, R16, R32, R64 = Round in which player lost in match play
"T" = Tied
Note that the HSBC Champions did not become a WGC event until 2009.

Team appearances
Amateur
European Boys' Team Championship (representing Wales): 1991
Jacques Léglise Trophy (representing Great Britain & Ireland): 1991 (winners)
Eisenhower Trophy (representing Great Britain & Ireland): 1992
European Amateur Team Championship (representing Wales): 1993 (winners), 1995
Walker Cup (representing Great Britain & Ireland): 1993
St Andrews Trophy (representing Great Britain & Ireland): 1994 (winners)

Professional
World Cup (representing Wales): 2002, 2003, 2004, 2005 (winners), 2006, 2007, 2008, 2016, 2018
Seve Trophy (representing Great Britain & Ireland): 2005 (winners), 2007 (winners)

See also
2019 European Tour Qualifying School graduates

References

External links

Welsh male golfers
European Tour golfers
People educated at Lewis School, Pengam
Sportspeople from Tredegar
Sportspeople from Cardiff
1973 births
Living people